Shannon Mato (born 21 August 1998) is a New Zealand-born Australian rugby league footballer who plays as a  for the Brisbane Broncos in the NRL Women's Premiership and the North Sydney Bears in the NRL Women's Premiership.

She previously played rugby union for the Queensland Reds and represented Australia.

Background
Mato was born in Whangarei, New Zealand, where she played rugby league, before moving to Australia in 2011.

Playing career

Rugby union
In 2017, Mato represented Griffith University at the AON Uni 7s series. In 2018, she began playing for the Queensland Reds in the Super W competition. In 2019, Mato her international debut for Australia against Japan.

Rugby league
In 2020, Mato joined the Wests Panthers in the Holcim Cup. On 27 September 2020, she joined the Brisbane Broncos in the NRL Women's Premiership. In Round 1 of the 2020 NRLW season, she made her debut for the Broncos in a 28–14 win over the New Zealand Warriors. On 25 October 2020, she started at prop in the Broncos' Grand Final win over the Sydney Roosters.

On 13 November 2020, she made her debut for Queensland in the Women's State of Origin win over New South Wales. On 20 February 2021, she represented the Māori All Stars in their 24–0 win over the Indigenous All Stars.

Achievements and accolades

Team
2020 NRLW Grand Final: Brisbane Broncos – Winners

References

External links
Brisbane Broncos profile

1998 births
Living people
New Zealand Māori rugby league players
Australian female rugby union players
Australia women's international rugby union players
Rugby league props
Brisbane Broncos (NRLW) players